Edward Denison Easton (10 April 1856 – 30 April 1915) was the founder and president of the Columbia Phonograph Company. Under Easton's leadership, Columbia developed from one of many regional subsidiaries of the North American Phonograph Company to one of the United States' three major record companies (along with Edison Records and Victor Talking Machine Co.) in the early part of the 20th century.

Life and career

Easton was born on April 10, 1856. He began his career as a court reporter before earning a law degree from Georgetown University in 1889. It was in this environment of reporting and stenography that Easton became interested in the nascent graphophone, then being marketed by the American Graphophone Company (also based in Washington D.C.) as a stenographic aid. American Graphophone's technology was consolidated with Edison's phonograph under the North American Phonograph Company in 1888, and the Columbia Phonograph Company established in January 1889 as one of its first regional subsidiaries. Though Easton and Columbia initially focused on stenography and related business applications, they quickly realized the financial potential of entertainment recording, using the automatic, or 'nickel-in-the-slot' phonograph, recording Sousa's U.S. Marine Band, and whistler John Yorke Atlee.

Columbia was North American's most successful subsidiary until North American's assignment and effective demise in 1894. Under Easton's leadership, Columbia began marketing discs in 1901 and ceased manufacturing cylinders in 1912. Easton remained president of Columbia until his death in April, 1915, having expertly navigated the enterprise to the top of the industry.

References 

1856 births
1915 deaths
Columbia Records
19th-century American businesspeople